The 1997 Cheltenham Gold Cup was a horse race which took place at Cheltenham on Thursday 13 March 1997. It was the 70th running of the Cheltenham Gold Cup, and it was won by Mr Mulligan. The winner was ridden by Tony McCoy and trained by Noel Chance. The pre-race favourite Imperial Call pulled-up before fence 18.

McCoy's victory completed a big-race double, as he had also ridden the winner of the Champion Hurdle two days earlier.

Race details
 Sponsor: Tote
 Winner's prize money: £134,810.00
 Going: Good
 Number of runners: 14
 Winner's time: 6m 35.5s

Full result

* The distances between the horses are shown in lengths or shorter. PU = pulled-up.† Trainers are based in Great Britain unless indicated.

Winner's details
Further details of the winner, Mr Mulligan:

 Foaled: 25 April 1988 in Ireland
 Sire: Torus; Dam: Miss Manhattan (Bally Joy)
 Owner: Michael and Geraldine Worcester
 Breeder: James Rowley

References
 
 sportinglife.com
 news.google.co.uk/newspapers – New Straits Times – 15 March 1997.

Cheltenham Gold Cup
 1997
Cheltenham Gold Cup
Cheltenham Gold Cup
1990s in Gloucestershire